Backdraft 2 (also known as Backdraft II) is a 2019 American action thriller film directed by Gonzalo López-Gallego and written by Gregory Widen. A sequel to the 1991 film Backdraft, also written by Widen, it stars Joe Anderson, with William Baldwin and Donald Sutherland reprising their roles as Brian McCaffrey and Ronald Bartel from the original film. It was released on a direct-to-video format on May 14, 2019.

Synopsis
Arson investigator Sean McCaffrey, son of the late Lieutenant Stephen "Bull" McCaffrey, works out of Station 17 of the Chicago Fire Department, one of the units in the division run by his uncle, Deputy District Chief of the Chicago Office of Fire Investigation (OFI) Brian McCaffrey. Sean prefers working alone, and is initially rude when Station 17's Captain White tells him he must follow protocol and work with a partner, Maggie Rening.

The new team is assigned a fire which killed five youngsters on Halloween. After they confirm the fire is arson, they later catch an arsonist who tells them that he had turned down a massive fee to set the Halloween fire. Sean talks with Ronald Bartel, a murderous arsonist who has been in prison for decades. Bartel provides insight that includes the involvement of terrorists, using fires to distract from the theft of missiles. A bomb is planted in Sean's home and Sean calls Brian and tells him about what happened. Brian drops by and sees if he can defuse it, but dies in the process. A funeral is held for Brian and Sean bids farewell to him just as he bid farewell to his father decades earlier. Ronald expresses condolences to Sean and explains to him where the terrorists possibly hang out. Sean and Maggie go after the terrorists, who are subsequently caught and defeated. And like in 1991, the film ends when a call comes in for another fire.

Cast

Release
The film was released on Blu-ray, DVD, and Digital on May 14, 2019.

Reception

References

External links
 

2019 action thriller films
2019 direct-to-video films
2010s American films
2010s English-language films
American action thriller films
American films about Halloween
American sequel films
Backdraft (franchise)
Chicago Fire Department
Direct-to-video action films
Direct-to-video sequel films
Direct-to-video thriller films
Films about arson
Films about firefighting
Films about terrorism in the United States
Films directed by Gonzalo López-Gallego
Films scored by Randy Edelman
Films set in Chicago
Films with screenplays by Gregory Widen
Imagine Entertainment films
Universal Pictures direct-to-video films